Giorgio Rautgartler or Giorgio Reitgherlet (died 10 December, 1600) was a Roman Catholic prelate who served as Bishop of Pedena (1573–1600).

Biography
On 27 April 1573, Giorgio Rautgartler was appointed during the papacy of Pope Gregory XIII as Bishop of Pedena. He served as Bishop of Pedena until his death on 10 December 1600.

References 

16th-century Roman Catholic bishops in Croatia
17th-century Roman Catholic bishops in Croatia
Bishops appointed by Pope Gregory XIII
1600 deaths